State elections in the Free State of Waldeck (prior to December 1921, the Free State of Waldeck-Pyrmont) during the Weimar Republic were held at 3-year intervals between 1919 and 1925. Results with regard to the total vote, the percentage of the vote won and the number of seats allocated to each party are presented in the tables below. Pyrmont, in accordance with the results of a plebiscite, was detached from Waldeck and incorporated into the Free State of Prussia on 30 November 1921. Following a second plebiscite, Waldeck itself also subsequently merged with Prussia on 1 May 1929.

1919
The 1919 Waldeck-Pyrmont state election was held on 9 March 1919 to elect 21 Constituent Landesvertreter (State Representatives).

1922
The 1922 Waldeck state election was held on 21 May 1922 to elect the 17 Landesvertreter (State Representatives).

1925
The 1925 Waldeck state election was held on 17 May 1925 to elect the 17 Landesvertreter (State Representatives).

References

Elections in Hesse
Elections in the Weimar Republic
Waldeck
Waldeck
Waldeck